Battle of Abukir may refer to:
 Battle of Abukir (1799), a battle of the French Revolutionary Wars
 Battle of Abukir (1801), a battle of the French Revolutionary Wars

See also
 Abukir, Egypt
 Battle of the Nile or Battle of Abukir Bay (1798)